Yu Gam-dong (Hangul: 유감동; Hanja: 兪甘同) (died after 1428), was a notable Gisaeng, dancer, writer, artist, and poet who lived during the Korean Joseon Dynasty of the 15th century. Her Gisaeng name was Gamdong.

Life 
She was from noble families of the Korean Joseon Dynasty; her father was Yu Gui-su (유귀수, 兪龜壽), Mayor of Hanseong. 

In her early years she was arranged to marry Choi Jung-ki (최중기, 崔仲基), a county governor and head of a myeon.

She was raped by Kim Yeo-dal (김여달, 金如達) and divorced, becoming a Gisaeng.  As a Gisaeng she was active as a dancer and poet.   She wrote poetry and painted pictures, but most of her work has been destroyed or not been preserved.

As a divorced woman, she became known for her love life, having numerous male lovers, something extremely controversial in Korean society at that time.  Reportedly, she had 39 lovers, among them Public Works Minister Seong Dal-saeng, secretary of the Office of Inspector-General Yi Hyo-rye, a craftsman as well as her husband's nephew and brother-in-law. This was technically adultery, as she was living estranged from her husband but not formally divorced from him. In 1428, in accordance with the law, she was therefore punished for adultery by being flogged and made a slave for a government office in a remote region.

There was at this time an increasing severity in the persecution of women who committed adultery, and particularly noblewomen such as Yu Gam-dong, Geumeumdong and Dongja, both noblewomen who committed adultery with male relatives and where punished, and above all the noblewoman Eoeuludong, who was executed in 1480 after a famous scandal in which she had committed adultery with multiple men including royal relatives, court officials and slaves, and these cases eventually resulted in the death penalty formally introduced for female adultery by King Jungjong in 1513.

See also 
 Heo Nanseolheon
 Shin Saimdang
 Hwang Jin-Yi

References

External links
 Yu Gam-dong 
 '에너벨 청'과 조선의 '유감동' - 오마이뉴스 2000.04.29 
 조선 성 풍속사 <제11화>:일요서울 
 유감동의 奸夫가 되다, 초수리 성달생  충북일보 2011.12.23 
 풍기문란죄로 교수형에 처해진 기생, 어우동(어을우동)과 살아남은 유감동  

15th-century Korean poets
15th-century dancers
15th-century Korean women writers
15th-century Korean painters
Korean female dancers
Korean women poets
Kisaeng

Year of birth unknown
Year of death unknown